On October 31, 2019, a mass shooting occurred in Orinda, California, during a house party that left five people dead and four others injured.

Location 

The location of the shooting in Orinda, California, was a residential house that had been rented through Airbnb by a woman who had reportedly told the property owner that she was hosting a family reunion for 12 people and that some guests had asthma and needed to gather at a location free of wildfire smoke. (The shooting took place during the Kincade Fire, which was burning about 85 miles north of Orinda). Due to the rental only being a one-night rental on Halloween, the owner told the renter that no parties were allowed.

The owner of the 4,000-square-foot (372-square-meter) four-bedroom house told reporters that they reached out to the renter after neighbors contacted them about the party. The home was equipped with a doorbell camera which the property owner used to verify that a party was taking place that violated the rental agreement. The house reportedly last sold for $1.2million in 2017 and was renting for $420a night on Airbnb at the time of the party.

Incident 

The shooting happened Halloween night at a party that was attended by at least 100 people. Neighbors had placed calls to police complaining about noise, shortly after 9 PM, and some officers were dispatched to the home. Additional police responded to the home after getting reports at 10:45 pm local time of gunshots being fired inside a short-term rental home, when officers arrived many of those at the party were fleeing the scene. A party-goer claimed that there was no warning about the event and that there had been no argument or physical altercation before the shooting.

Victims 

Four men in their twenties were killed, while a 19-year-old female died of her injuries on November 1. Several others were injured, either through gunshots or from fleeing the scene.

Investigation 

The Contra Costa County Sheriff's Office crime lab investigated the incident and the two firearms that were retrieved from the home.

San Francisco Police investigated possible links between two of the victims, the Page Street Mob gang, and a quadruple homicide in 2015.

The Contra Costa County Sheriff’s Department served search warrants on November 14, 2019, in the morning in San Mateo, Marin City, Vallejo, and Antioch in connection to the arrests of five individuals. Four of the suspects were charged with murder and conspiracy and the fifth was charged as an accessory. On November 18 all of the suspects were released as the county district attorney declined to press charges pending further investigation. Multiple law enforcement agencies have described the incident as a shootout.

On November 21, 2019, the Contra Costa Sheriff's Department and Federal Agents arrested two more suspects on weapons and child endangerment charges, seizing a gun linked to this and multiple other shootings.

Response 

A memorial was created outside the home, and a large memorial of flowers, photos of the individuals who died, and notes of sympathy were left at a fountain in downtown Orinda. One sign at the memorial read, "Your lives matter."

Airbnb's co-founder and CEO Brian Chesky announced a change in company policy on November 2, stating that the company would carry out a site-wide ban on "party houses" and would implement a system that would screen for and flag potential high-risk reservations. The company will also create a dedicated rapid response team, to take immediate action against users who violate the new guest policies including the potential removal of the guests or renters.

Council members of the city scheduled a special hearing shortly after the shooting to discuss the incident and to determine if there was a need for possible regulations to prohibit out-of-control parties. Other concerns addressed during the meeting were rental properties, in which a short-termed ordinance banning short-term rentals was passed and property owners are now required to register with the city if they plan on renting a room or home for less than 30 days.

Some residents in Orinda and the greater San Francisco Bay Area expressed frustration that the reaction to the shooting focused more on Airbnb policy than on empathy for the victims. There were questions about whether the news coverage of this event, where all the victims were persons of color, was comparable to that for other mass shootings.

See also
 List of homicides in California
 List of mass shootings in the United States in 2019
 Mass shootings in the United States

References 

2019 crimes in California
2019 mass shootings in the United States
Crimes in the San Francisco Bay Area
Deaths by firearm in California
Mass shootings in California
Mass shootings in the United States
October 2019 crimes in the United States
Orinda, California